Alfredo Fígaro (born July 7, 1984) is a Dominican former professional baseball pitcher. He made his Major League Baseball debut on June 20, 2009 with the Detroit Tigers and he also played for the Milwaukee Brewers.

Professional career

Detroit Tigers
Fígaro was  drafted in the 2006 MLB draft and signed with the Detroit Tigers. He was a signed to their Rookie League affiliate, the GCL Tigers. With GCL in 2006 he had a 3–1 win–loss record with a 0.70 earned run average (ERA) in 14 games, four of which were starts. In 2007, Fígaro started the season at Single-A Oneonta and went 4–2 with a 3.38 ERA in 11 starts before being called up to the Lakeland Tigers. At Lakeland he had a 0–2 win–loss record in four starts. To begin 2008, the Tigers sent Fígaro to another one of their three Single-A affiliates, the West Michigan Whitecaps. With the Whitecaps, Fígaro had a career high in wins (12), starts (19), complete games (2), innings pitched (123) and strikeouts (96). He was called back up to Lakeland and for a second season didn't have any wins, going 0–5 with a 4.91 ERA in five starts. Fígaro started 2009 with the Double-A Erie SeaWolves and was named Eastern League player of the week for the week of April 20. For the season he has a 5–2 record with a 4.10 ERA.

Fígaro was called up on June 20, 2009, and to clear room for him, the Tigers designated Dane Sardinha for assignment. Fígaro made his major league debut on June 20, 2009, replacing Willis in the starting rotation. In 2009, he had a 2–2 record with a 6.35 ERA and 16 strikeouts in 17 innings and three starts. In his second start he gave up seven earned runs and 10 hits in three innings against the Houston Astros. Tigers manager Jim Leyland said of the outing, "He pitched very tentative until the horse was out of the barn. The one thing I thought he would be was aggressive. He pitched like he was caught up in the names on the back." He was demoted to the Triple-A Toledo Mud Hens in favor of Luke French on June 29, 2009.

Orix Buffaloes
On December 14, 2010, the Tigers sold his contract to the Orix Buffaloes of Nippon Professional Baseball. He re-signed with Orix on November 14, 2011.

Milwaukee Brewers
On January 31, 2013, the Brewers signed Fígaro to a minor league contract, with an invitation to spring training. He beat out fellow reliever Donovan Hand as the last player to be added to the 25-man roster after spring training.

Texas Rangers
On October 2, 2014, the Texas Rangers claimed Figaro off waivers from Milwaukee.

Samsung Lions
Figaro signed with the Samsung Lions for the 2015 season.

Los Angeles Dodgers
On June 11, 2016, Figaro signed a minor league deal with the Los Angeles Dodgers, where he played with the AA Tulsa Drillers and the AAA Oklahoma City Dodgers in 2016. In 10 games between those two teams (and the rookie league Arizona League Dodgers) he was 3–0 with a 2.70 ERA.

Uni-President 7-Eleven Lions
Figaro signed with the Uni-President 7-Eleven Lions of the Chinese Professional Baseball League for the 2017 season.

Personal life
Fígaro is the cousin of Toros de Tijuana pitcher Fernando Rodney.

References

External links

1984 births
Living people
Arizona League Brewers players
Arizona League Dodgers players
Detroit Tigers players
Dominican Republic expatriate baseball players in Japan
Dominican Republic expatriate baseball players in South Korea
Dominican Republic expatriate baseball players in Taiwan
Dominican Republic expatriate baseball players in the United States
Erie SeaWolves players
Estrellas Orientales players
Gulf Coast Tigers players
KBO League pitchers
Lakeland Flying Tigers players

Major League Baseball pitchers
Major League Baseball players from the Dominican Republic
Milwaukee Brewers players
Nashville Sounds players
Nippon Professional Baseball pitchers
Oklahoma City Dodgers players
Oneonta Tigers players
Orix Buffaloes players
Samsung Lions players
Toledo Mud Hens players
Tigres del Licey players
Tulsa Drillers players
Uni-President Lions players
West Michigan Whitecaps players
Dominican Republic expatriate baseball players in Nicaragua